Coleophora parthica is a moth of the family Coleophoridae that is endemic to Iran.

References

External links

parthica
Endemic fauna of Iran
Moths described in 1994
Moths of the Middle East